Rockvale is an unincorporated community in Carbon County, Montana, United States. It is currently the site of a bar and casino, and some homes. Little remains of the original town site except the nearby cemetery.

It at the intersection of U.S. Route 212 and Montana Secondary Highway 310. Rock Creek runs south of town.

Demographics

History
Rockvale's post office was established on May 12, 1894, with Orren Clawson as its first postmaster. The post office closed on April 30, 1914.

References

Unincorporated communities in Carbon County, Montana
Unincorporated communities in Montana